The 2008 ASEAN University Games, officially known as the 14th ASEAN University Games, was a Southeast Asian university multi-sport event held in Kuala Lumpur, Malaysia from 11 to 21 December 2008. This was the third time Malaysia hosted the games after 1984 and 1993.

Around 1789 athletes participated at the event which featured 219 events in 21 sports. The final medal tally was led by host Malaysia.

Venues
The 14th ASEAN University Games had 24 venues for the games, 9 in Kuala Lumpur, 14 in Selangor and 1 in Negeri Sembilan.

Branding and design

The logo of the 2008 ASEAN University Games is an image of a red brush stroke human figure which represents high spirit, glory, victory, power and strength and the stars on the logo represents the targets and the ambitions of the ASEAN University Games athletes. The font use for the logo, a mixture of century gothic and trajan, represents the ASEAN University Games being an event that has a variety of formal and informal agendas, while the font's stair-like arrangement represents the desire to achieve success. Meanwhile, the colours used for the font (blue, red, white and yellow) are the colours of the Malaysian flag, the ASEAN logo and the flags of its member nations.

The mascot of the 2008 ASEAN University Games is A1 Angkasawan, the astronaut which is described as friendly, smart, high spirit and strong. The use of an astronaut as the event's mascot was to remind people about Malaysia's achievement as the first ASEAN member country that sends an astronaut to space back in 2007. The mortar board of the mascot represents the academic excellent and the participation of university students as athletes of the games. The logo on the chest represents the sportsmanship spirit of the athletes participating at the 14th ASEAN University Games. The colours, blue, red, white and yellow represents Malaysia as the host of the games, with the colour blue also represents the symbol of excellence in hosting the games. Overall, the mascot represents the determination of participating athletes to achieve their respective dreams.

"Menggapai bintang" (Reach for the stars) was the theme song of the games. It was composed by Mohd Zaki Bin Ahmad from Universiti Malaysia Pahang and sung by Shahnizal bt. Mohd Arshad with lyrics was written by Ahmad Fedtri Bin Yahya.

The Game's Torch is shaped like a pen, an instrument used in worldwide universities.

The games

Participating nations

 
 
 
 
 
 
 
 
 
 

Note: Myanmar did not participate

Sports

Calendar

Medal table

Results

Archery

References

External links
 2008 ASEAN University Games official website
 Games Results System
 Bowling results

ASEAN University Games
2008 in Malaysian sport
2008 in multi-sport events
2008 in Asian sport
Multi-sport events in Malaysia
Sport in Kuala Lumpur
International sports competitions hosted by Malaysia